This Man Is Dangerous (French: Cet homme est dangereux) is a 1953 French thriller film directed by Jean Sacha and starring Eddie Constantine, Colette Deréal and Grégoire Aslan. It is an adaptation of Peter Cheyney's 1936 novel This Man Is Dangerous. It followed the film La môme vert-de-gris which had been Eddie Constantine's debut as Lemmy Caution and it was also successful at the box office.

The film's sets were designed by the art director Jean d'Eaubonne.

Synopsis 
Lemmy Caution is assigned to neutralise the international crimininal network of villain Siégella (Grégoire Aslan ) as an undercover agent. In order to infiltrate the gang he pretends to be an escapee. During his covert investigations at the French Riviera he gets to know a beauty named Constance  (Colette Deréal) who is associated with Mister  Siégella. Lemmy can convince him that he would help to kidnap the rich American heiress Miranda Van Zelden (Claude Borelli). Once Lemmy has obtained enough proof to have  Siégella convicted, he informs Interpol. After he has sent documents to Interpol, his cover is blown and he has to fight for his life.

Cast 
 Eddie Constantine as Lemmy Caution
 Colette Deréal as Constance
 Grégoire Aslan as Siegella
 Claude Borelli as Miranda Van Zelden
 Véra Norman as Susanne
 Jacqueline Pierreux as Dora
 Roland Bailly as Johny
 Guy Decomble as Jacques le Dingue
 Luc Andrieux as Maurice
 Henry Djanik as William Bosco
 Émile Genevois as L'athlète
 Colette Mareuil as L'entraîneuse
 Michel Nastorg as Govas
 Michel Seldow as Pierrot les Cartes

References

Bibliography
 Goble, Alan. The Complete Index to Literary Sources in Film. Walter de Gruyter, 1999.

External links
 
 
   Cet homme est dangereux - French Gallery

1953 films
1950s French-language films
Films based on British novels
French black-and-white films
Films directed by Jean Sacha
French thriller films
1950s thriller films
1950s French films